Civia is a class of electric multiple unit trains built by CAF and Siemens for the Renfe Cercanías commuter railway networks in Spain. The first units entered service in 2003.

The Civia train concept was created with passenger comfort and build quality in mind, and to meet the goals of reliability, frequency and punctuality. They have better provision for disabled passengers than older Cercanías trains.

Technical details 
Civia units use 3kV DC overhead electrification.

Modularity 
Civia are modular units - trains can be formed from two, three, four or five cars as required. There are four car types:
 A1 - end car with driving cab and normal floor.
 A2 - end car with driving cab and normal floor.
 A3 - intermediate car and downstairs WC.
 A4 - intermediate car with normal floor.

Cities and routes 
Civia units operate in the following cities and regions:
 Asturias
 Cádiz
 Catalonia
 Madrid
 Málaga
 
 Seville
 Valencia 
 Zaragoza

Accidents and incidents 

On 28 July 2017, Class 465 unit 210M collided with a buffer stop at  station, causing 54 injuries with 5 of which serious.

Gallery

Scheme

See also 
 Ivolga (train)
 DBAG Class 422
 DBAG Class 423
 DBAG Class 424
 Cercanías
 Renfe

References

External links 

 Renfe - Our Trains
 Ferropedia - Renfe Civia  (Spanish)

CAF multiple units
Siemens multiple units
3000 V DC multiple units
Renfe multiple units
Cercanías